Hell Hath Fury is an anthology of fantasy fiction short stories edited by George Hay, the third of a number of anthologies drawing their contents from the classic magazine Unknown of the 1930s-1940s. It was first published in hardcover by Neville Spearman in October 1963.

The book collects seven tales by various authors, together with a preface by the editor.

Contents
 "Preface" (George Hay)
 "Hell Hath Fury" (Cleve Cartmill) (Unknown Worlds, Aug. 1943)
 "The Bleak Shore" (Fritz Leiber, Jnr.) (Unknown Fantasy Fiction, Nov. 1940)
 "The Frog" (P. Schuyler Miller) (Unknown Worlds, Oct. 1942)
 "The Refugee" (Jane Rice) (Unknown Worlds, Oct. 1943)
 "The Devil's Rescue" (L. Ron Hubbard) (Unknown Fantasy Fiction, Oct. 1940)
 "The Cloak" (Robert Bloch) (Unknown, May 1939)
 "The Extra Bricklayer" (A. M. Phillips) (Unknown Fantasy Fiction, Sep. 1940)

Notes

1963 anthologies
Fantasy anthologies
Works originally published in Unknown (magazine)